The 2013 Chapramari Forest train accident occurred on 13 November 2013 in the eastern area of the Chapramari Wildlife Sanctuary, between Chalsa and Nagrakata, Jalpaiguri district, West Bengal.

The accident killed or injured 17 Indian elephants and has been described as the worst of its kind in recent history.

Background
The Wildlife Protection Society of India reported that 20 elephants were killed in 2007. In 2013, the tally on the Chapramari track, specifically, reached 17 including those killed by 13 November accident.

The number of wild elephants in all of India is thought to be about 26,000.

Accident
At approximately 17:40 on 13th November 2013 - Wednesday, an Assam-bound passenger train travelling through the Chapramari Forest, Udaipur City–Kamakhya Kavi Guru Express (19709), approached the Jaldhaka River Bridge at ~80 km/h and collided with a herd of 40–50 Indian elephants, killing five adults and two calves and injuring ten others.

Surviving elephants fled but soon returned to the scene of the accident and remained there until being dispersed by officials.

Aftermath
Additional Divisional Railway Manager B. Lakra stated, "We have heard of the accident. All necessary actions are being taken. Special relief train has been sent and all Assam bound trains are being deviated through alternate route." The track was reopened for service after 12 hours. A meeting to discuss future prevention was held between forest and railway officials on 14 November.

According to a telephone interview of Jalpaiguri divisional forest officer Bidyut Sarkar conducted by The New York Times, "one female elephant, whose leg was fractured by the train and was unable to stand, fell into a ravine below the track, unreachable by cranes or trucks, so veterinarians descended and set up a camp near her to provide treatment". The remains of one elephant were caught up in the structure of the bridge and necessitated disintegration for removal.

Some injured elephants remain in critical condition.

Jalpaiguri protest
A protest seeking better regulation for trains passing through the wildlife sanctuary occurred on 14 November in Jalpaiguri. In an unrelated statement by West Bengal's forest minister, Hiten Burman, it was noted that official requests to a similar effect have been disregarded by railway authorities in the past.

Repercussions
The accident reignited discussion over the history and administration of the 168 km track, which spans New Jalpaiguri to Alipurduar and also passes through Buxa Tiger Reserve. Animesh Basu, a coordinator for the Himalayan Nature and Adventure Foundation, criticised the government's response to the issue of its national heritage animal being frequently hit by trains, highlighting the irony of Indian Railways' use of an elephant calf as its mascot.

Electric fencing, stationary lighting, and motion sensors have each been proposed as technical measures to prevent similar incidents in the future.

Investigation
Officials plan to launch an investigation into the causes of the accident. Speeding is suspected as a possible contributing factor. The train was traveling at 80 km/h and guidelines specify a limit of 40 km/h.

Reaction
Minister of State for Railways Adhir Ranjan Chowdhury stated that the accident "happened outside the area which has been earmarked as elephant corridor" and that it "is the responsibility of the state government to protect the wildlife [because] railway officials cannot".

References

2013 disasters in India
2013 animal deaths
Railway accidents in 2013
Transport and the environment
Chapramari Forest train accident
Transport in Jalpaiguri district
Elephants in India
November 2013 events in India